Sylvie Kinigi (born 24 November 1953) is a Burundian politician and economist who served as Prime Minister of Burundi from 10 July 1993 to 7 February 1994, and acting president from November 1993 to 5 February 1994, making her the second African woman to serve as a president. 

Born to a Tutsi family, she earned a degree in banking from the University of Burundi in 1979 and another diploma from the Centre de Formation de la Profession Bancaire in Paris. Politically, Kinigi was closely affiliated with the Union pour le Progrès national (UPRONA), Burundi's only legal political party at the time, and was an active member of the Union des Femmes Burundaises, a subgroup of UPRONA, serving as a member of its central committee by 1987. In that capacity she lobbied for legislative changes and government measures to benefit women. In 1990 Kinigi was hired by the Bank of the Republic of Burundi to direct its department of research and statistics, and the following year she was placed in charge of Burundi's structural adjustment program. 

In the summer of 1993 Burundi hosted free elections, which were won by UPRONA's rival, Front pour la Démocratie au Burundi (FRODEBU). The new FRODEBU President of Burundi, Melchior Ndadaye, appointed Kinigi Prime Minister of Burundi on 10 July. Kinigi wished to pursue economic development while she was prime minister, but thought that this could not be achieved until ethnic tensions between Tutsis and Hutus were reduced. Thus, she declared that ethnic reconciliation would be her top priority. On 21 October President Ndadaye and several other officials were killed by Tutsi soldiers in a coup attempt, leaving her the highest-ranking official alive and the de facto head of state of Burundi. 

She joined her surviving ministers in the French embassy until she could return to her residence under French military guard as the coup failed. Though her government proved unable to contain the ethnic violence following the coup, she played a key role in brokering a political compromise that allowed for the election of Cyprien Ntaryamira as the next president. She resigned when he took office in 1994 and assumed an executive position at the Banque Commerciale du Burundi. She then held several international positions before returning to Burundi in 2008 and becoming an independent economic consultant.

Early life and education
Sylvie Ntigashira was born on 24 November 1953 in Mugoyi, Bujumbura Rural Province, Ruanda-Urundi. Ethnically, she is Tutsi. Her father was a merchant, while her mother farmed and maintained their home. The third of six children, Ntigashira was allowed to attend school while the oldest daughter in the family helped their mother. She was given a primary and secondary education by nuns in the Ijenda parish. She then studied at the University of Burundi under the Faculty of Economic Sciences, graduating in 1979 with a degree in banking and credit. In 1990 she earned a Diplômes d'études supérieures from the Centre de Formation de la Profession Bancaire in Paris. 

In 1973 Ntigashira married a Burundian academic, Firmin Kinigi, who had taught her in school, and had four or five children with him. He was ethnically Hutu. Her husband supported her desire to further her education and career and the family hired a maid to take care of their house and children. He died in 1992 or 1993.

Career

Early political and government work 
Urundi became independent from Belgium as Burundi in July 1962. The country quickly fell under the political domination of Tutsis at the expense of the Hutu majority ethnic group. Kinigi believed that democracy was introduced too rapidly in Burundi without proper preparation, leading to political organising along ethnic lines and the heightening of ethnic tensions. Burundi's government became controlled by Tutsi military officers, who ruled for approximately 30 years. Politically, Kinigi was closely affiliated with the Union pour le Progrès national (UPRONA), Burundi's only legal political party, and was an active member of the Union des Femmes Burundaises, a subgroup of UPRONA, serving as a member of its central committee by 1987. In that capacity she lobbied for legislative changes and government measures to benefit women.

In 1990 Kinigi was hired by the Bank of the Republic of Burundi to direct its department of research and statistics, while also teaching courses at the University of Burundi. In 1991 she left the job when President Pierre Buyoya appointed her Special Consultant in the Office of the Prime Minister, making her responsible for the implementation of Burundi's structural adjustment program. In that capacity she conducted negotiations with the International Monetary Fund, the World Bank, and foreign donors. Impressed with her work, Buyoya subsequently appointed her Permanent Secretary in the Ministry of Economic Planning.

Prime Minister of Burundi 
In the summer of 1993 Burundi underwent a democratic transition. The country hosted free elections, which were won by UPRONA's rival, Front pour la Démocratie au Burundi (FRODEBU). The new President of Burundi, Melchior Ndadaye—the leader of FRODEBU and the first Hutu to become head of state, offered Kinigi the position of Prime Minister of Burundi in his new government to succeed Adrien Sibomana. She reportedly considered the offer for some time, but eventually decided to accept it, reasoning that she was not more politically inexperienced than the army officers which had previously ruled the country. Furthermore, she was personally acquainted with Ndadaye, having studied alongside him at Parisian institutions and even sat on a committee that judged his academic performance. She was also an acquaintance of Léonard Nyangoma and Cyprien Ntaryamira, two FRODEBU politicians who Ndadaye wanted to become ministers in the new government. Speaking of her selection, Kinigi stated that it was "a good surprise for Burundian women primarily, but for African women too."

FRODEBU hardliners were angered by Kinigi's appointment, seeing her assumption of the premiership to be a betrayal by Ndadaye. Radical UPRONA members were also displeased with her selection, since the party did not formally nominate her as a candidate, and they felt that Ndadaye had chosen her purely because she was a Tutsi woman and did not expect to rely on her abilities in office. The government ultimately comprised two-thirds Hutu and one-third Tutsi members. Kinigi was one of two women ministers. The government was sworn-in on 10 July. Kinigi wished to pursue economic development while she was prime minister, but thought that this could not be achieved until ethnic tensions were reduced. Thus, she declared that ethnic reconciliation would be her highest priority. In mid-October she dispatched her ministers across the country on a mission to promote calm and understanding; she went to the northeast to denounce the "barbarism" of political violence associated with the previous elections.

On 21 October President Ndadaye and several other officials were killed by Tutsi soldiers in a coup attempt. A puppet civilian figure, François Ngeze, was presented by military authorities as the new head of state. Kinigi's bodyguards remained loyal to her during the takeover. She and other senior government figures took refuge in the French embassy. She was the highest-ranking civilian official to survive the coup attempt. From the embassy she continued to issue directives on government policy. Buyoya and his predecessor, Jean Baptiste Bagaza, both gave their support to her government and the coup failed due to an outbreak of violence and international condemnation. On 7 November she left the embassy and returned to her residence under French military guard. The death of Ndadaye and others in the presidential line of succession left her de facto head of state of Burundi. Tutsi extremists continued to employ violence in the aftermath of the coup, intimidating Kinigi's government and preventing it from leading the country.

Kinigi's government—comprising 15 of the original 22 ministers—stabilised the situation in Bujumbura, the capital, but proved unable to contain the ethnic violence across the country following the coup, in which thousands died. The radical Tutsi UPRONA faction became disgruntled with her actions before and especially during the crisis. With regards to her failure to attend a commemoration for the anniversary of the death of erstwhile UPRONA leader Louis Rwagasore on 13 October, the newspaper Panafrika wrote, "for a prime minister who said she was from Uprona, missing this ceremony was for some 'proof' that Sylvie Kinigi was not from Uprona. Some do not hesitate to say that if it hadn't been for this October 21 coup, she would now be at FRODEBU". The newspaper L’Observateur argued "not having been mandated by UPRONA, knowing simply that she is Prime Minister thanks to God and to Ndadaye and to FRODEBU, the first lady [sic] will behave during the crisis of October 1993 as one would expect. She will be totally absent and when she tries to come forward, it is to tirelessly repeat the theses of FRODEBU". On 15 November she wrote a letter to the Secretary General of the Organisation of African Unity, appealing for a military intervention to restore order in the country. The army and opposition politicians denounced this as a proposal for a "recolonization" of Burundi. In December her government appointed a commission of inquiry led by the Procurator General to investigate human rights abuses that had occurred after the coup, but its work never began due to objections from the parliamentary opposition.

Kinigi, burdened by the leadership responsibility placed upon her by the political vacuum, sought to enable the selection of a new president. On 9 January 1994, at her direction, the National Assembly modified Article 85 of the Burundian constitution, empowering itself to elect the next president of Burundi. Four days later the National Assembly elected Ntaryamira to become president in a vote, 78 to one. Ntaryamira was scheduled to be inaugurated on 22 January, but the parliamentary opposition, led by UPRONA, filed a suit with the Constitutional Court to block the installment. They argued that Article 182 of the constitution, which stipulated that the document could not be modified in times of national crisis, rendered the National Assembly's amending of Article 85 void. FRODEBU parliamentarians argued that the change was necessary to fill the vacancy, since holding a national election to replace the former president would have been impossible. The Constitutional Court ruled in favor of the opposition in a decision split along ethnic lines. The Hutu justices subsequently resigned and on 29 January Kinigi's government issued a decree dismissing the Tutsi justices. This led to several days of violence in Bujumbura. With the assistance of United Nations representative Ahmedou Ould-Abdallah, Kinigi brokered a compromise with the opposition, whereby Ntaryamira would be installed as president with a new UPRONA prime minister, and the Constitutional Court would be reinstated. Ntaryamira was sworn-in on 5 February. Kinigi resigned as prime minister when he was inaugurated. On 7 February Ntaryamira appointed Anatole Kanyenkiko to replace her.

Kinigi was the second woman to serve as president of an African country, after Carmen Pereira of Guinea-Bissau, who also held the office in an interim fashion. Opinions on her time in government were starkly divided. Many of her Tutsi contemporaries regarded her as vacuous and a negative influence on the country, with Panafrika denouncing her as "Madame Fiasco". She retained a significant amount of respect among FRODEBU members. Responding to criticism of her leadership, Marc Manirakiza wrote, "What could she have done in the face of an unforeseen and unprecedented chaotic situation?" Reflecting on her time in government in 1999, Kinigi said it made people realise "that a woman can do even more than a man can do, with a soul of a mother and strong will, at the highest level of politics." Linking her to her contemporary in Rwanda, Agathe Uwilingiyimana, political scientist Jane Jansen wrote that the two women "owed their temporary rise to the top to an attempt to find an accommodation to the ethnic conflicts that plagued their respective countries."

Later work 
Upon leaving government, Kinigi assumed an executive position at the Banque Commerciale du Burundi. She then held several international positions, including jobs at the United Nations Educational, Scientific and Cultural Organization, the United Nations Development Programme (representing it in Equatorial Guinea, Cameroon, and Senegal), and the office of the UN Special Envoy for the Great Lakes Region in Nairobi, where she served as a political advisor and programme coordinator. She returned to Burundi in 2008 and became an independent economic consultant. In that capacity she advocated for the right of women to inherit land and property and for the use of democracy. In 2016 the Carter Center selected Kinigi to lead its international election observer mission in Zambia for that year's general elections.

See also
List of the first women holders of political offices in Africa

Notes

References

Works cited 
 
 
 
 
 
 
 
 
 
 
 
 
 
 

|-

1953 births
20th-century women politicians
Women government ministers of Burundi
Burundian women activists
Female heads of state
Living people
Prime Ministers of Burundi
Presidents of Burundi
Tutsi people
Union for National Progress politicians
Women prime ministers
University of Burundi alumni
Burundian economists